Alexandre Frutos (born April 23, 1982) is a French professional football player of Spanish origin, currently playing for VV Tielt. He is a left-footed winger.

Career

Club career
Frutos began his football career with Metz in 2000. In 2004, he joined Ligue 1 side Châteauroux on loan before joining English side Brighton and Hove Albion the following season with French compatriot Sébastien Carole.

Frutos made 36 appearances for Brighton in the Championship during the 2005-06 season, scoring 3 goals. During the 2006-07 season in League One, Frutos failed to make an impact in the Brighton first team and only made a handful of appearances under manager Dean Wilkins. In July 2007 he agreed to have his Brighton contract cancelled by mutual consent. Since then he has become a journeymen in the Belgium lower leagues playing for RFC Tournai, KSK Ronse.

References

1982 births
Living people
People from Vitry-le-François
French footballers
French expatriate footballers
Brighton & Hove Albion F.C. players
LB Châteauroux players
FC Metz players
K.S.K. Ronse players
R.F.C. Tournai players
Ligue 1 players
Expatriate footballers in England
Expatriate footballers in Belgium
French expatriate sportspeople in England
French expatriate sportspeople in Belgium
French people of Spanish descent
Association football midfielders
Sportspeople from Marne (department)
Sint-Eloois-Winkel Sport players
Footballers from Grand Est